The Ambassador Permanent Representative of Spain to the European Union is a senior diplomat of the Spanish government representing the Kingdom of Spain before the Institutions of the European Union. As such, it is the official responsible for carrying out the guidelines established by the Minister of Foreign Affairs or, by delegation, by the Secretary of State for the European Union.

Origin 
In late 1985, Spain and the European Communities finalized the negotiations for the admission of Spain in the Communities. At the same time, the Spanish government created the position of Ambassador Permanent Representative to the European Communities to represent the Kingdom and defend the interests of Spain before the European Institutions, although the Permanent Mission was officially created on January 17, 1986.

With the signing of the Treaty of the European Union in Maastricht in 1992, the European Communities disappear and the current European Union is properly created, so the name of the permanent mission is changed to Ambassador Permanent Representative of Spain to the European Union in December 1995.

Permanent Representation 
The permanent representation depends administratively and economically on the Ministry of Foreign Affairs through the Secretariat of State for the European Union. The law defines it as "the accredited body, representative and management, by Spain to the European Union and ensure the presence of Spain in the institutions and bodies dependent on it."

The mission is headed by the Ambassador Permanent Representative. As a collaborator and substitute for the Ambassador, there is a Deputy Ambassador Permanent Representative, who is also appointed by the Government, at the proposal of the Minister of Foreign Affairs and after hearing the Interministerial Committee for the European Union Affairs. The representation is also made up of the Ambassador Permanent Representative of Spain to the Political and Security Committee (PSC).

Apart from the aforementioned senior positions, the representation is composed of lesser diplomatic personnel such as advisers, embassy secretaries and attachés, who are freely appointed by the minister. Non-diplomatic personnel are appointed by the Foreign Minister at the proposal of the ministerial department that requests it.

Ambassadors

References 

Permanent Representatives to the European Union
Lists of ambassadors of Spain